Carl Wallin may refer to:

 Carl E. Wallin (1879–1968), Swedish-American artist
 Carl Georg August Wallin (1893–1978), Swedish mariner painter